Balioxena iospila is a species of moth of the family Tortricidae. It is found in Madagascar.

References

External links

Archipini
Endemic fauna of Madagascar
Moths described in 1912
Moths of Madagascar
Taxa named by Edward Meyrick